Truxinic acids are any of several stereoisomeric cyclic dicarboxylic acids with the formula (C6H5)2C4H4(COOH)2, found in various plants. They are obtained by a photochemical cycloaddition from cinnamic acid, where the two trans alkenes react head-to-head.

Isomers
Ten stereoisomers are possible.

See also
 Truxillic acids, which are isomers of the truxinic acids

References

Dicarboxylic acids
Cyclobutanes
Phenyl compounds